The anus (Latin, 'ring' or 'circle') is an opening at the opposite end of an animal's digestive tract from the mouth. Its function is to control the expulsion of feces, the residual semi-solid waste that remains after food digestion, which, depending on the type of animal, includes: matter which the animal cannot digest, such as bones; food material after the nutrients have been extracted, for example cellulose or lignin; ingested matter which would be toxic if it remained in the digestive tract; and dead or excess gut bacteria and other endosymbionts.

Amphibians, reptiles, and birds use the same orifice (known as the cloaca) for excreting liquid and solid wastes, for copulation and egg-laying. Monotreme mammals also have a cloaca, which is thought to be a feature inherited from the earliest amniotes via the therapsids. Marsupials have a single orifice for excreting both solids and liquids and, in females, a separate vagina for reproduction. Female placental mammals have completely separate orifices for defecation, urination, and reproduction; males have one opening for defecation and another for both urination and reproduction, although the channels flowing to that orifice are almost completely separate.

The development of the anus was an important stage in the evolution of multicellular animals. It appears to have happened at least twice, following different paths in protostomes and deuterostomes. This accompanied or facilitated other important evolutionary developments: the bilaterian body plan, the coelom, and metamerism, in which the body was built of repeated "modules" which could later specialize, such as the heads of most arthropods, which are composed of fused, specialized segments.

Development

In animals at least as complex as an earthworm, the embryo forms a dent on one side, the blastopore, which deepens to become the archenteron, the first phase in the growth of the gut. In deuterostomes, the original dent becomes the anus while the gut eventually tunnels through to make another opening, which forms the mouth. The protostomes were so named because it was thought that in their embryos the dent formed the mouth first (proto– meaning "first") and the anus was formed later at the opening made by the other end of the gut. Research from 2001 shows the edges of the dent close up in the middles of protosomes, leaving openings at the ends which become the mouths and anuses.

See also

References

External links 
 

 
Digestive system